The Cuban Revolutionary Navy is the navy of Cuba.

History
The Constitutional Navy of Cuba was the navy of Cuba that existed prior to 1959. During World War II, it sank the German submarine U-176 on 15 May 1943.

During the Cold War, the Cuban Navy successfully captured the freighters Leyla Express and Johnny Express, both vessels blamed for CIA-related activities against Cuba. 
In 1988, the Cuban Navy boasted 12,000 men, three submarines, two modern guided-missile frigates, one intelligence vessel, and a large number of patrol craft and minesweepers. However, most of the Soviet-made vessels have been decommissioned or sunk to make reefs. By 2007, the Cuban Navy was assessed as being 3,000 strong (including up to 550+ Navy Infantry) by the IISS with six Osa-II and one . The Cuban Navy also includes a small marine battalion called the Desembarco de Granma. It once numbered 550 men though its present size is not known.

Cuban Navy today 

After the old Soviet submarines were put out of service, Cuba searched for help from North Korea's experience in midget submarines. North Korean defectors claimed to have seen Cubans in mid to late 1990s in a secret submarine base and appeared in public view years later a single picture of a small black native submarine in Havana harbour. It is rumored to be called 'Delfin' and is to be armed with two torpedoes. Only a single boat is in service and the design appears original, even if influenced both by North Korea and Soviet designs.

The Cuban Navy rebuilt one, large ex-Spanish Rio Damuji fishing boat. BP-390 is now armed with two C-201W missiles, one twin 57 mm gun mount, two twin 25 mm gun mounts and on 14.5 mm machine gun. A second unit (BP-391) was converted and entered service in 2016.

The Cuban Navy today operates its own missile systems, the made-in-Cuba Bandera (a copy of the dated Styx Soviet missiles) and Remulgadas anti-ship missile systems, as well as the nationally produced Frontera self-propelled coastal defence multiple rocket launcher. The navy's principal threats are drug smuggling and illegal immigration. The country's geographical position and limited naval presence has enabled traffickers to utilise Cuban territorial waters and airspace.

The Cuban Navy's air wing is an ASW helicopter operator only and is equipped with 2 MI-14 Haze helicopters.

Fleet

Current

Fleet equipment 

 2 s, 1 × 57 mm gun, 2 Styx surface-to-surface missiles, 1 × 12.7 mm machine gun, 2 × 25 mm autocannons.
 1 Delfin-class submarine, possibly 2 torpedo launchers. Rumored derived from North Korean .
 1 Pauk II-class fast patrol craft, Coastal with 1 × 76 mm gun, 4 anti-submarine torpedo tubes, 2 anti-submarine weapon rocket launcher – 495 tons full load – commissioned 1990.
 6 former Soviet Union (FSU) Osa II-class PFM missile boats; 13 Type II transferred.
 3 ex-Soviet Union (FSU) s; 4 transferred.
 5 Former Soviet Union (FSU) ; 11 transferred.
 1 Intelligence collection vessel.

Ground forces organization 

 2 amphibious assault battalions.
 1 coastal defense field artillery regiment
 1 coastal defense missile artillery regiment
 1 light armored battalion (amphibious)

Naval Ground forces equipment 

 122 mm artillery.
 M-1931/3 artillery.
 130 mm: M-46 artillery.
 152 mm: M-1937 artillery.
 ≈10 SSC-3 surface-to-surface missile systems.
 18–24 Remulgadas coastal defense surface multiple missile launchers
 20 Bandera coastal defense surface multiple missile launchers
 12 RBU-6000 Frontera coastal defense multiple rocket launchers
 18–22 PT-76 light tanks

Naval Aviation aircraft 

The border guards have: 2 Stenka class patrol boats and as of 2007 approximately a dozen, down from 30/48, Zhuk patrol craft. Cuba makes Zhuk patrol craft and some are seen with an SPG-9 mounted on front of the twin 30mm guns.

Historic 

 1 Soviet  with 533 mm and 406 mm torpedo tube (non-operational); 3 transferred
 3 Soviet  corvettes with 2 Anti-Submarine Weapon Rocket Launcher (non-operational); 3 transferred
 4 Soviet Osa I/II-class missile boats with 4 SS-N-2 Styx surface-to-surface missile+
 1 Soviet Pauk II-class fast patrol craft, coastal with 2 anti-submarine weapon rocket launcher, 4 anti-submarine torpedo tube
 1 Soviet/Polish  medium landing ship, capacity 180 troops, 6 tanks (non-operational)

References

Cuba
Military of Cuba
Military history of Cuba